Solodniki is a rural locality (a selo) and the administrative center of Solodnikovsky Selsoviet, Chernoyarsky District, Astrakhan Oblast, Russia. The population was 1,657 as of 2010. There are 42 streets.

Geography 
Solodniki is located on the Volga River, 81 km northwest of Chyorny Yar (the district's administrative centre) by road. Zelyony Sad is the nearest rural locality.

References 

Rural localities in Chernoyarsky District